Kane Township is one of twenty townships in Benton County, Iowa, USA.  As of the 2000 census, its population was 944.

Geography
According to the United States Census Bureau, Kane Township covers an area of 35.59 square miles (92.17 square kilometers).

Cities, towns, villages
 Keystone

Adjacent townships
 Homer Township (north)
 Big Grove Township (northeast)
 Union Township (east)
 Leroy Township (southeast)
 Iowa Township (south)
 Salt Creek Township, Tama County (southwest)
 York Township, Tama County (west)
 Oneida Township, Tama County (northwest)

Cemeteries
The township contains these four cemeteries: Holy Cross, Irving, Keystone and Redman.

Major highways
  U.S. Route 30

School districts
 Belle Plaine Community School District
 Benton Community School District

Political districts
 Iowa's 3rd congressional district
 State House District 39
 State Senate District 20

References
 United States Census Bureau 2007 TIGER/Line Shapefiles
 United States Board on Geographic Names (GNIS)
 United States National Atlas

External links

 
US-Counties.com
City-Data.com

Townships in Benton County, Iowa
Cedar Rapids, Iowa metropolitan area
Townships in Iowa